Psychological pricing (also price ending, charm pricing) is a pricing and marketing strategy based on the theory that certain prices have a psychological impact. In this pricing method, retail prices are often expressed as just-below numbers: numbers that are just a little less than a round number, e.g. $19.99 or £2.98. There is evidence that consumers tend to perceive just-below prices (also referred to as "odd prices") as being lower than they actually are, tending to round to the next lowest monetary unit. Thus, prices such as $1.99 may to some degree be associated with spending $1 rather than $2. The theory that drives this is that pricing practices such as this cause greater demand than if consumers were perfectly rational. Psychological pricing is one cause of price points.

Overview
According to a 1997 study published in the Marketing Bulletin, approximately 60% of prices in advertising material ended in the digit 9, 30% ended in the digit 5, 7% ended in the digit 0 and the remaining seven digits combined accounted for only slightly over 3% of prices evaluated. In the UK, before the withdrawal of the halfpenny coin in 1969, prices often ended in 11d (elevenpence halfpenny: just under a shilling, which was 12d); another example (before 1961) was £1/19/11¾d. (one pound, nineteen shillings and elevenpence three farthings) which is one farthing under £2. US$2.199).

In a traditional cash transaction, fractional pricing imposes tangible costs on the vendor (printing fractional prices), the cashier (producing awkward change) and the customer (stowing the change). These factors have become less relevant with the increased use of checks, credit and debit cards and other forms of currency-free exchange; also, the addition of sales tax makes the pre-tax price less relevant to the amount of change (although in Europe the sales tax is generally included in the shelf price).

The psychological pricing theory is based on one or more of the following hypotheses:

 Thomas and Morwitz (2005) coined the term "left-digit effect" and suggested that this bias is caused by the use of an anchoring heuristic in multi-digit comparisons.
 Another rationale for just-below pricing is prospect theory. This theory holds that "consumers facing uncertainty in decision making, base the value of an alternative on gains or losses offered by the alternative, relative to some reference point, rather than on final absolute states of wealth or welfare." The theory also incorporates evidence that small deviations from a reference point tend to be over-valued. So, based on prospect theory, pricing something only a few cents under a whole dollar could be beneficial. This theory works well because of how the reference point is established by the consumer. The reference point for something that is $19.98 would be $20. This leads the just-below price to be seen as involving a gain, thus making it feel like a better deal.
 Consumers ignore the least significant digits rather than do the proper rounding. Even though the cents are seen and not totally ignored, they may subconsciously be partially ignored. Keith Coulter, Associate Professor of Marketing at the Graduate School of Management, Clark University, suggests that this effect may be enhanced when the cents are printed smaller (for example, $1999).
 Fractional prices suggest to consumers that goods are marked at the lowest possible price.
 When items are listed in a way that is segregated into price bands (such as an online real estate search), price ending is used to keep an item in a lower band, to be seen by more potential purchasers.

The theory of psychological pricing is controversial. Some studies show that buyers, even young children, have a very sophisticated understanding of true cost and relative value and that, to the limits of the accuracy of the test, they behave rationally. Other researchers claim that this ignores the non-rational nature of the phenomenon and that acceptance of the theory requires belief in a subconscious level of thought processes, a belief that economic models tend to deny or ignore. Results from research using modern scanner data are mixed.

Now that many customers are used to just-below pricing, some restaurants and high-end retailers psychologically-price in even numbers in an attempt to reinforce their brand image of quality and sophistication.

Theories 
Kaushik Basu used game theory in 1997 to argue that rational consumers value their own time and effort at calculation. Such consumers process the price from left to right and tend to mentally replace the last two digits of the price with an estimate of the mean "cent component" of all goods in the marketplace. In a sufficiently large marketplace, this implies that any individual seller can charge the largest possible "cent component" (99¢) without significantly affecting the average of cent components and without changing customer behavior. Ruffle and Shtudiner's (2006) laboratory test shows considerable support for Basu's 99-cent pricing equilibrium, particularly when other sellers' prices are observable.

The introduction of the euro in 2002, with its various exchange rates, distorted existing nominal price patterns while at the same time retaining real prices. A European wide study (el Sehity, Hoelzl and Kirchler, 2005) investigated consumer price digits before and after the euro introduction for price adjustments. The research showed a clear trend towards psychological pricing after the transition. Further, Benford's Law as a benchmark for the investigation of price digits was successfully introduced into the context of pricing. The importance of this benchmark for detecting irregularities in prices was demonstrated and with it a clear trend towards psychological pricing after the nominal shock of the euro introduction.

Another phenomenon noted by economists is that a price point for a product (such as $4.99) remains stable for a long period of time, with companies slowly reducing the quantity of product in the package until consumers begin to notice. At this time, the price will increase marginally (to $5.05) and then within an exceptionally short time will increase to the next price point ($5.99, for example).

Several studies have shown that when prices are presented to a prospect in descending order (versus ascending order) positive effects result, mainly a willingness to pay a higher price, higher perceptions of value, and higher probability of purchase. The reason for this is that when presented in the former, the higher price serves as a reference point, and the lower prices are perceived favorably as a result.

Psychological pricing in consumer behavior
Thomas and Morwitz (2005) suggested that this bias is a manifestation of the pervasive anchoring heuristic in multi-digit comparisons. (The anchoring heuristic is one of the heuristics identified by Nobel laureate Kahneman and his co-author Tversky.) Judgments of numerical differences are anchored on leftmost digits, causing a bias in relative magnitude judgments. This hypothesis suggests that people perceive the difference between 1.99 and 3.00 to be closer to 2 than to 1 because their judgments are anchored on the leftmost digit.

Stiving and Winer (1997) examined the left-digit effect using scanner panel models. They proposed that 9-ending prices can influence consumer behavior through two distinct processes: image effects and level effects. Image effect suggests that 99-ending prices are associated with images of sales promotions. Level effect captures the magnitude underestimation caused by anchoring on leftmost digits of prices. Their results suggest that both of these effects account for the influence of 9-ending prices in grocery stores. Manning and Sprott (2009) demonstrated that left-digit anchoring can influence consumer choices using experimental studies.

Choi, Lee, and Ji (2012) examined the interactive effects of 9-ending prices and message framing in advertisements. The researchers found that when pairing nine-ending prices with positive messages, advertisements were much more positively received by consumers. This in turn increased their likelihood of making a purchase decision.

Psychological pricing in financial markets
Left-digit effect has also been shown to influence stock-market transactions. Bhattacharya, Holden, and Jacobsen (2011) examined the left-digit effect in stock market transactions. They found that there was excess buying at just-below prices ($1.99) versus round numbers ($2.00) right above them. This discrepancy in buy-sell can lead to significant changes in 24-hour returns, that can meaningfully impact markets.

Psychological pricing in public policy
Research has also found psychological pricing relevant to the study of politics and public policy. For instance, a study of Danish municipal income taxes found evidence of "odd taxation" as tax rates with a nine-ending were found to be over-represented compared to other ending digits. Further, it was found that citizens’ evaluations of public-school districts in a Danish population changed noticeably based on the leftmost digit. In particular, the researchers looked at minuscule changes in average grades that shifted the leftmost digit. Once this value changed, citizens responded more drastically and as such their stance in terms of public policy on the issue changed.

MacKillop et al. (2014) looked at how the left-digit effect affects the relationship between price hikes and smoking cessation.  There was a very clearly demonstrated inverse relationship between the price of cigarettes and individual's motivation to smoke.  Researchers found that price hikes that impacted the leftmost digit in the price (i.e. $4.99 vs. $5.00) were particularly effective in causing change among adult smokers.  These findings can be utilized by public policy researchers and legislators to implement more effective cigarette tax policies.

Regulation 
According to Davidovich-Weisberg (2013), in Israel several high-profile regulatory commissions have joined to ban retailers from charging prices ending in 99.  These regulatory bodies have claimed that this was an attempt to make prices look less expensive to customers.  In addition, due to the phasing out of certain denominations of coins in Israel, these quirky prices also made little practical sense in terms of everyday shopping.

Historical comments
Exactly how psychological pricing came into common use is not clear, though it is known the practice arose during the late 19th century. One source speculates it originated in a newspaper pricing competition. Melville E. Stone founded the Chicago Daily News in 1875, intending to price it at one cent to compete with the nickel papers of the day. The story claims that pennies were not common currency at the time, and so Stone colluded with advertisers to set whole dollar prices a cent lower—thus guaranteeing that customers would receive ample pennies in change.

Others have suggested that fractional pricing was first adopted as a control on employee theft. For cash transactions with a round price, there is a chance that a dishonest cashier will pocket the bill rather than record the sale. For cash transactions with a just-below price, the cashier must nearly always make change for the customer. This generally means opening the cash register which creates a record of the sale in the register and reduces the risk of the cashier stealing from the store owner.

In the former Czechoslovakia, people called this pricing "baťovská cena" ("Baťa's price"), referring to Tomáš Baťa, a Czech manufacturer of footwear. He began to widely use this practice in 1920.

Price ending has also been used by retailers to highlight sale or clearance items for administrative purposes. A retailer might end all regular prices in 95 and all sale prices in 50. This makes it easy for a buyer to identify which items are discounted when looking at a report.

In its 2005 United Kingdom general election manifesto, the Official Monster Raving Loony Party proposed the introduction of a 99-pence coin to "save on change".

A recent trend in some monetary systems is to eliminate the smallest denomination coin (typically 0.01 of the local currency). The total cost of purchased items is then rounded up or down to, for example, the nearest 0.05. This may have an effect on future just-below pricing so as to maximize the rounding advantage for vendors by favoring 98 and 99 endings (rounded up) over 96 and 97 ending (rounded down) especially at small retail outlets where single-item purchases are more common. Australia is a good example of this practice where 5 cents has been the smallest denomination coin since 1992, but pricing at .98 or .99 on items under several hundred dollars is still almost universally applied (e.g.: $1.99–299.99) while goods on sale often price at .94 and its variations. It is also the case in Finland and the Netherlands, the first two countries using the euro currency to eliminate the 1 and 2 cent coins.

See also
 Infomercial
 Pricing
 Price point
 Marketing mix
 Mental accounting
 Microeconomics
 Numerical cognition
 Take a penny, leave a penny

References

Citations

General and cited references

External links

 The Left-Digit Effect in Price Cognition
 Heuristics in Numerical Cognition
 99-cent pricing hooks shoppers
 Nine-ending Price and Consumer Behavior: An Evaluation in a New Context (PDF)
 "Get smart for just $9.99"
 "Perfect Pricing: The psychology of online prices"

Business intelligence terms
Cognitive biases
Consumer behaviour
Pricing